Ugiloy Kuchkarova (born 7 December 1996) is an Uzbekistani footballer who plays as a defender for Women's Championship club Sevinch and the Uzbekistan women's national team.

International career
Kuchkarova capped for Uzbekistan at senior level during the 2018 AFC Women's Asian Cup qualification and the 2020 AFC Women's Olympic Qualifying Tournament.

International goals
Scores and results list Uzbekistan's goal tally first

See also
List of Uzbekistan women's international footballers

References 

1996 births
Living people
Uzbekistani women's footballers
Uzbekistan women's international footballers
Women's association football defenders
People from Fergana Region
21st-century Uzbekistani women